Avvocata ("advocate" in reference to the Madonna as the advocate of humanity) is a quarter of  Naples, southern Italy. It is just outside, to the west, of the original historic centre of the Greco-Roman city of Naples. It is the first area beyond the original city developed under the Spanish viceroyship when the Spanish moved into the Kingdom of Naples in the mid-16th century. The most prominent landmark in the area is the large square, Piazza Dante.

References 

Quartieri of Naples